Adam Walker may refer to:
Adam Walker (American football, born 1963), American football running back
Adam Walker (American football, born 1968), American football running back
Adam Walker (Australian politician) (1829–1902), Australian politician
Adam Walker (British politician), leader of the British National Party
Adam Walker (Canadian politician), provincial politician from British Columbia
Adam Walker (flautist) (born 1987), English classical flautist
Adam Walker (footballer) (born 1991), English footballer
Adam Walker (ice hockey) (born 1986), Scottish ice hockey player
Adam Walker (inventor) (1730–1821), English writer and inventor
Adam Walker (rugby league) (1991–2022), Scotland international rugby league footballer
Adam Brett Walker, American baseball outfielder